Bisceglia is an Italian surname. Notable people with the surname include:

Christian Bisceglia (born 1967), Italian film director and screenwriter
Marco Bisceglia (1925–2001), Italian pro-gay priest
Michel Bisceglia (born 1970), Belgian musician
Pat Bisceglia (1930–2009), American football player
Vitangelo Bisceglia (1749–1822), Italian agronomist and botanist

Italian-language surnames